Diego l'interdite is a Mauritian 2002 documentary film directed by David Constantin.

Synopsis 
This documentary tells of how the Chagossians were torn from their islands in the northern Indian Ocean. In 1965, the Colonial British authorities declared the isle separate from Mauritius in exchange of its independence. Then, the United States rented Diego Garcia, the largest of the isles, to install a military base and the population was sent to Mauritius. The Chagossians have spent the past 36 years living in extreme poverty in Mauritius, dreaming of one day going home.

Awards 
 Gran Premio Europeo de las Primeras Películas 2002
 Vues d’Afrique 2003

References 

2002 films
Mauritian documentary films
2002 documentary films
Chagos Archipelago sovereignty dispute